Thomas Albert (born April 12, 1985) is an American politician from Michigan. Albert is a Republican member of the Michigan Senate from the 18th district. Albert previously served as a  member of Michigan House of Representatives from District 86.

Early life
Albert was born in Grattan Township, Michigan on April 12, 1985, to Jim Albert, a teacher, and Edna Albert, a social worker; both are now retired. He is the youngest of five brothers. He attended elementary school in Ada Township, Michigan, and attended Belding High School.

Education
In 2007, Albert earned a Bachelor of Arts in Political Science/History from University of Michigan, and in 2013, he earned an MBA in Finance at Michigan State University.

Career
Albert was a member of the U.S. Marine Corps and Marine Corps Reserve. He was an investor at State of Michigan Retirement Systems. In 2013, he became an investment analyst at State of Michigan University's Bureau of Investor.

On November 8, 2016, he won the election and became a Republican member of Michigan House of Representatives for District 86. Albert defeated Lynn Mason, Bill Gelineau, and Cliff Yankovich with 59.79% of the votes. On November 8, 2018, Albert won reelection. He defeated Lauren Taylor and Sue Norman with 60.0% of the votes.

In 2022, Albert was elected to the Michigan Senate from the 18th district.

Personal life
Albert's wife is Erica, a teacher. They have five children.

See also
 2016 Michigan House of Representatives election
 2018 Michigan House of Representatives election

References

External links
 Thomas Albert at ballotpedia.org

1985 births
Living people
21st-century American politicians
Republican Party members of the Michigan House of Representatives
Republican Party Michigan state senators
University of Michigan College of Literature, Science, and the Arts alumni
Eli Broad College of Business alumni
People from Kent County, Michigan